The Phosphorescent Blues is the fourth studio album by the American group Punch Brothers, released on January 27, 2015. The band announced the release of the album's first single, "I Blew It Off", on November 17, 2014, On December 4, 2014, the group announced the album's name and release date, along with the second single, "Julep". Julep was nominated for Best American Roots Song and Best American Roots Performance at the 2016 Grammy Awards.  The album's cover is from the René Magritte painting "The Lovers" (1928).

Track listing

Personnel
 Chris Thile – lead vocals, bouzouki, mandola, mandolin
 Noam Pikelny – banjo
 Chris Eldridge – acoustic guitar
 Paul Kowert – bass
 Gabe Witcher – fiddle
 Jay Bellerose – drums
 T Bone Burnett – electric guitars on "I Blew It Off", "Magnet" and "Little Lights"

References

2015 albums
Albums produced by T Bone Burnett
Nonesuch Records albums
Punch Brothers albums